The 1st Caucasus Cossack Division was a cavalry unit within the Imperial Russian Army. They were headquartered at Kars.

Commanders 
 1879: S. A. Sheremetev
 1898–1899: Alexei Domontovich
 1912–1915: Nikolai Baratov
 1916–1918: Ernest-Avgust Ferd. Raddatz

Chiefs of Staff 
 1879–1880: Yakov Dmitryevich Malama
 1896: A. A. Zegelov
 1901–1902: Fyodor Chernozubov

Commanders of the 1st Brigade 
 1893–1894: Alexei Domontovich

Commanders of the 2nd Brigade 
 1878–1879: Kelbali Khan Nakhchivanski
 1907–1912: Dmitry Abatsiyev

External links 
 Страница на Regiment.ru

Cavalry divisions of the Russian Empire
Cossack military units and formations